Oleg Georgievich Grigoryev (born 25 December 1937) is a retired Russian Olympic bantamweight boxer. He won the European title in 1957, 1963 and 1965 and an Olympics gold medal in 1960.

Career
Grigoryev took up boxing in 1951. He was the Soviet bantamweight champion in 1958, 1962–65 and 1967, placing second in 1957 and 1960. He also won the Military Spartakiads of the Friendly Armies of the Socialist Countries in 1961, 1962, and finished second in 1963. He was a favorite at the 1964 Olympics, but was eliminated in the third bout. He retired from competitions in 1968 with a record of 176 wins out of 196 bouts.

Highlights
USSR–FRG Duals (54 kg), Moscow, Soviet Union, February 1956:
Defeated Manfred Hahner (West Germany) by decision
 European Championships (54 kg), Prague, Czechoslovakia, May–June 1957:
1/16: Bye
1/8: Defeated Jorma Limmonen (Finland) by unanimous decision, 3–0
1/4: Defeated Heinz Huber (Austria) by walkover
1/2: Defeated Peter Goschka (West Germany) by unanimous decision, 3–0
Finals: Defeated Gianfranco Piovesani (Italy) by unanimous decision, 3–0
 European Championships (54 kg), Lucerne, Switzerland, May 1959:
1/16: Bye
1/8: Defeated Peter Weiss (Austria) by unanimous decision, 5–0
1/4: Defeated Primo Zamparini (Italy) by unanimous decision, 5–0
1/2: Defeated Miodrag Mitrović (Yugoslavia) by split decision, 3–2
Finals: Lost to Horst Rascher (West Germany) by unanimous decision, 0–5
Scandinavia–USSR Duals (54 kg), Stockholm, Sweden, April 1960:
Defeated V. Lindblad (Sweden)
 XVII Summer Olympics (54 kg), Rome, Italy, August–September 1960:
1/32: Bye
1/16: Defeated Wald Claudiano (Brazil) by unanimous decision, 5–0
1/8: Defeated Francis Taylor (Great Britain) by split decision, 3–2

1/4: Defeated Myint Thein (Burma) by walkover
1/2: Defeated Brunon Bendig (Poland) by majority decision, 4–1
Finals: Defeated Primo Zamparini (Italy) by split decision, 3–1–1
 European Championships (54 kg), Moscow, Soviet Union, May–June 1963:
1/8: Bye
1/4: Defeated Ferenc Cserge (Hungary) by decision
1/2: Defeated Rainer Poser (East Germany) by decision
Finals: Defeated Branislav Petrić (Yugoslavia) KO 3
XVIII Summer Olympics (54 kg), Tokyo, Japan, October 1964:
1/32: Bye
1/16: Defeated Gyula Török (Hungary) RSC 2
1/8: Defeated Franco Zurlo (Italy) by unanimous decision, 5–0
1/4: Lost to Juan Fabila Mendoza (Mexico) by split decision, 2–3
 European Championships (54 kg), East Berlin, East Germany, May 1965:
1/16: Bye
1/8: Defeated Jimmy Henry (Ireland) by decision
1/4: Defeated Tibor Papp (Hungary) by decision
1/2: Defeated Nicolae Gîju (Romania) by decision
Finals: Defeated Jan Gałązka (Poland) by decision

References

External links

 Biography

1937 births
Living people
Honoured Masters of Sport of the USSR
Recipients of the Order of the Red Banner of Labour
Soviet male boxers
Bantamweight boxers
Olympic gold medalists for the Soviet Union
Boxers at the 1960 Summer Olympics
Boxers at the 1964 Summer Olympics
Olympic boxers of the Soviet Union
Armed Forces sports society athletes
Olympic medalists in boxing
Russian male boxers
Medalists at the 1960 Summer Olympics